Teenage Father is a 1978 American short film directed by Taylor Hackford and starring Timothy Wead. In 1979, it won an Oscar for Best Short Subject at the 51st Academy Awards.

Plot
Filmed as a pseudo-documentary, the film follows 17-year-old John Travis and 15-year-old Kim in the last few months of her pregnancy. The documentary filmmakers interview the couple as well as their friends and family about their perspectives on the matter. John is interested in adoption but Kim is more interested in keeping her child. In the final scene of the film the child has been born and John views his son in the nursery but by that point Kim is no longer speaking to him and does not let him visit her in her room, leaving John distraught about the future.

Cast
 Tim Wead as John
 Suzanne Crough as Kim
 Ken Sansom as John's Father
 Lette Rehnolds as John's Mother
 Jeannie Dimter Barton Kim's Mother
 Gary Mathew as Skip
 Paul Wolff as Denny
 Roland Meza as Roland
 Wesley Thompson as Charlie
 Denise Davis as Wanda
 Devin Buchanan as Devin
 Susan Cronkite as Social Worker

Production
The film was a public education film from Children's Home Society of California. Susan Cronkite, who plays the social worker in the film, was an actual social worker for Children's Home Society at the time of filming.

References

External links

FilmAffinity
MUBI

1978 films
1978 short films
1978 independent films
American independent films
American short films
Films directed by Taylor Hackford
Films set in California
Films shot in California
Live Action Short Film Academy Award winners
Teenage pregnancy in film
1970s English-language films
1970s American films